Hells Canyon Dam is a concrete gravity dam in the western United States, on the Snake River  in Hells Canyon along the Idaho-Oregon border.

It is the third and final hydroelectric dam of the Hells Canyon Project, which includes Brownlee Dam (1959) and Oxbow Dam (1961), all built and operated by Idaho Power Company. The Hells Canyon Complex on the Snake River is the largest privately owned hydroelectric power complex in the nation, according to the US Energy Information Administration. The contractor for the Hells Canyon Dam was Morrison-Knudsen of Boise.

Power generation began with two units in 1967, the third came on line the following year.
 
Lacking passage for migrating salmon, the three dams of the Hells Canyon Project blocked access by anadromous salmonids to a stretch of the Snake River drainage basin from Hells Canyon Dam up to Shoshone Falls, which naturally prevents any upstream fish passage to the upper Snake River basin.

High dam proposal

As proposed by the U.S. Army Corps of Engineers, the Hells Canyon High Dam would have been a straight-profile concrete gravity dam with two gate-controlled tunnel spillways, one in each abutment.

The power plant was to be capable of generating  850 MW using ten units. The project included provisions for fish hatcheries, with the intention of maintaining salmon runs. Project cost was estimated at $342,076,000. The high dam project was not pursued.

See also 

 List of power stations in the United States
 List of dams in the Columbia River watershed

References

External links 

 Hells Canyon Dam, Northwest Power and Conservation Council
 Hells Canyon Complex, Idaho Power

Buildings and structures in Adams County, Idaho
Dams in Idaho
Dams in Oregon
Hydroelectric power plants in Idaho
Buildings and structures in Wallowa County, Oregon
Idaho Power dams
Dams completed in 1967
Energy infrastructure completed in 1967
Energy infrastructure completed in 1968
1967 establishments in Oregon
Dams on the Snake River
Gravity dams
1967 establishments in Idaho
United States privately owned dams